Nuno Miguel dos Santos Gomes (born 6 December 1979) is a Portuguese retired footballer who played as a central defender.

Club career
Gomes was born in Porto. A Boavista F.C. youth graduate who never played for its first team – or in the country's Primeira Liga – he plied the vast majority of his trade in the lower leagues of Portugal, Spain and Greece. His only two top-division experiences came with Marsaxlokk F.C. in the Maltese Premier League and FC Vaslui, appearing in just two Liga I games in his only season with the latter club.

Gomes retired from football at the age of only 28.

External links

1979 births
Living people
Footballers from Porto
Portuguese footballers
Association football defenders
Liga Portugal 2 players
Segunda Divisão players
Boavista F.C. players
U.S.C. Paredes players
F.C. Marco players
C.D. Aves players
Gondomar S.C. players
Tercera División players
Maltese Premier League players
Marsaxlokk F.C. players
Liga I players
FC Vaslui players
Portugal youth international footballers
Portuguese expatriate footballers
Expatriate footballers in Spain
Expatriate footballers in Malta
Expatriate footballers in Romania
Expatriate footballers in Greece
Portuguese expatriate sportspeople in Spain
Portuguese expatriate sportspeople in Romania
Portuguese expatriate sportspeople in Greece